Suzana Sousa (born in Luanda in 1981) is an Angolan independent curator, producer, cultural manager, and researcher.
She was Director of the Exchange Office of the Ministry of Culture of Angola. She has curated exhibitions at the Jewish Museum in New York, the Natural History Museum in Luanda, the Berardo Museum in Lisbon, the Almeida Garrett Municipal Gallery in Porto, and the Musée d'Art Moderne de Paris.

See also 
Odile Burluraux, Parisian curator

References 

Living people

1981 births
20th-century women
21st-century women
Angolan women curators
People from Luanda
Angolan curators